Aridius may refer to:
Quintus Aridius Rufinus, a Roman consul of the early 3rd century